The New Kasson Apartments is a historic apartment building located on James Street in the Near Northeast neighborhood of Syracuse, Onondaga County, New York. It was designed by architectural firm of Merrick and Randall and built in 1898.  It is a seven-story, Renaissance Revival style building consisting of two rectangular multi-story blocks.  It is a yellow brick and limestone building with cast stone and terra cotta details. The facades features projecting three-sided bays extending from the first through fifth floors.  It is located across from the Leavenworth Apartments built in 1912.

It was listed on the National Register of Historic Places in 2011.

Gallery

References 

Residential buildings on the National Register of Historic Places in New York (state)
Renaissance Revival architecture in New York (state)
Residential buildings completed in 1898
Buildings and structures in Syracuse, New York
National Register of Historic Places in Syracuse, New York